Flåskjer is a small village in the municipality of Ørsta, Møre og Romsdal, Norway. It lies at the entrance to the Flåskjer valley, along the shore of the Vartdalsfjorden.

Fishing in one of the activities available in Flåskjer.

References

Ørsta
Villages in Møre og Romsdal